Glipostenoda guana is a species of beetle in the genus Glipostenoda. It was described in 1999.

References

guana
Beetles described in 1999